Mælen or Melsnuten is a mountain in the municipality of Suldal in Rogaland county, Norway. The mountain Trollaskeinuten lies just to the northeast of Mælen.

References

Mountains of Rogaland
Suldal